Bellperre is a luxury mobile designer company based in Amsterdam. The company is known for its leather technology.

The company was founded in 2005. The Company came in to the market in 2007 with the launch of its first luxury mobile phone Bellperre in the internationally representative computer expo CEBIT fair held in Hanover fairground. The company competes with, among other luxury mobile companies, Vertu, Goldvish and Gresso.

The company's products are completely devoid of plastic, and use instead leather, steel, gold, hardwood, sapphire, and other materials to make mobile phones.

Partnership
Bellperre partnered with Capi, The Travellers Electronics Company with its shops in 25 countries.

References

See also 
Gresso
Goldvish
Vertu

Mobile phone manufacturers
Companies based in Amsterdam
2013 establishments in the Netherlands